Night Train to Venice is a 1993 German contemporary Gothic-horror film directed by Carlo U. Quinterio. This international production was a cooperation of British, Italian, and German artists, including Hugh Grant, Malcolm McDowell, Tahnee Welch, Evelyn Opela, Kristina Söderbaum and Rachel Rice (Big Brother 9 winner). It was filmed in 1993 and released worldwide in 1995.

The film has been criticized for the non-linear plot it follows and the obvious references to the Gothic genre. In a radio interview in 2002, Hugh Grant deemed the film the worst he has ever been in.

The thriller presents a labyrinthine combination of sexual transgression, darkness and intrigue, bearing a strong similarity to other Gothic texts, including Dracula. The story itself features obscure icons, such as the constant appearance of a woman and child dressed in white, ferocious Rottweilers with a taste for human flesh, Venetians in strange masks and recurring figures of the Commedia dell'arte; all of these elements wrapped in a dream-like atmosphere.

Synopsis 
The young Scottish journalist Martin Gimmle (Grant) is traveling to Venice by train to drop off a copy of his book on European Neo-Nazism to an unknown publisher. On the way there he meets a bevy of odd characters. Among them is The Stranger (McDowell), an illusive and evil character, who has mysterious powers over people, and even their dreams. He also encounters Vera (Welch), a performer who is travelling with her daughter, and he falls in love with her.

Martin eventually becomes prey to his menacing surroundings, following the trail of Neo-Nazi gangs. Their leader, The Stranger, uses his powers on Martin, causing him the loss of his memory. The only persons who can help him to go back to his former self are Vera and her daughter.

Cast 
 Hugh Grant as Martin
 Tahnee Welch as Vera
 Malcolm McDowell as Stranger
 Kristina Söderbaum as Old Woman (Euphemia)
 Rachel Rice as Pia
 Evelyn Opela as Tatjana
 Robinson Reichel as Skinhead Udo

References

External links 
 
 
 

1996 films
English-language German films
1990s thriller films
Rail transport films
Films set in Munich
Films set in Venice
1995 horror films
1995 films
1990s English-language films
1990s German films